The Collection is a compilation album by Welsh rockabilly singer Shakin' Stevens, released in April 2005. A live performance DVD was also released with the CD in Europe and was only available in the UK via import versions. In May 2005, a different DVD, called The DVD Collection, was released, which included 27 songs and bonus material. The Collection peaked at number 4 on the UK Albums Chart.

Reception
Reviewing the album for AllMusic, Thom Jurek described it as a "dynamite find" and that "there have been many compilations over the years, but none are this extensive or pervasive in covering his underappreciated career. The DVD included with the import version offers proof as to why Stevens sold out concert halls all over Europe and Japan". Joe Goodden for BBC Wales Music described the album as a "definitive collection of Shakin' Stevens hits" and that it "should deservedly revive the fortunes of one of Wales' most fondly remembered and successful singers".

Track listing

Charts

Weekly charts

Year-end charts

Certifications and sales

References

2005 greatest hits albums
Shakin' Stevens albums
Epic Records compilation albums
Sony BMG compilation albums